The Fernley and Lassen Railway Depot, 675 E. Main St. in Fernley, Nevada was built in 1914, and was the eastern end of the Fernley and Lassen Railway line of the Southern Pacific, 30 miles from Reno, NV. Also known as Southern Pacific Railroad Depot, it was listed on the National Register of Historic Places in 2005.

It is a  wood-frame building of the Southern Pacific Railroad Company's "Common Standard Station Plan #22" and is significant as a good surviving example of railroad pattern book architecture, and the only example of that specific plan surviving in Nevada.  It was used as a railway station until 1985.

The historic train depot was part of 112-mile Fernley and Lassen Railway, which joined the Red River Lumber Company in Westwood with the main line of the Southern Pacific Railroad Company, unifying the Southern Pacific Railroad's system in Oregon, Nevada, and California and providing rail transportation to farming and ranching communities in northeastern California and northwestern Nevada.

References 

Buildings and structures in Lyon County, Nevada
Railway stations on the National Register of Historic Places in Nevada
Railway stations in the United States opened in 1914
Former Southern Pacific Railroad stations in Nevada
Railway stations closed in 1985
National Register of Historic Places in Lyon County, Nevada